Ellis Creek is a  long 2nd order tributary to the Cape Fear River in Bladen County, North Carolina.

Course
Ellis Creek rises in Suggs Mill Pond, a Carolina Bay, about 5 miles west of Ammon, North Carolina in Bladen County.  Ellis Creek then flows south-southeast to join the Cape Fear River about 1 mile south of Yorick, North Carolina.

Watershed
Ellis Creek drains  of area, receives about 49.0 in/year of precipitation, has a wetness index of 610.62 and is about 19% forested.

See also
List of rivers of North Carolina

References

Rivers of North Carolina
Rivers of Bladen County, North Carolina
Tributaries of the Cape Fear River